Anti-Corruption Commission may refer to:

Anti-Corruption Commission (Bangladesh)
Anti-Corruption Commission of Myanmar
Kenya Anti-Corruption Commission
Malaysian Anti-Corruption Commission
National Anti-Corruption Commission (Thailand)
Anti-Corruption Commission of Namibia
Sierra Leone Anti-corruption Commission
National Anti-Corruption Commission (Australia)

See also
Anti-corruption (disambiguation)